Tadahiko Taira (born November 12, 1956) is a Japanese former Grand Prix motorcycle road racer.

Born in Minamisōma, he won three consecutive All Japan 500cc championships in 1983, 1984 and 1985. Taira began his Grand Prix career in 1984 with Yamaha. He enjoyed his best season in 1987 when he finished the season in sixth place overall in the 500cc world championship. His only Grand Prix victory came in 1986 at the 250cc San Marino Grand Prix. In 1990, he teamed with Eddie Lawson to win the Suzuka 8 Hours endurance race.

Grand Prix career statistics

Points system from 1969 to 1987:

Points system from 1988 to 1992:

(key) (Races in bold indicate pole position; races in italics indicate fastest lap)

References

External links 

1956 births
Living people
Sportspeople from Fukushima Prefecture
Japanese motorcycle racers
250cc World Championship riders
500cc World Championship riders